Limekiln at Coalbrookdale is an oil on panel painting by J. M. W. Turner, painted c. 1797. It is held at the Yale Center for British Art, in New Haven.

References

1790s paintings
Paintings by J. M. W. Turner
Landscape paintings
Paintings in the Yale Center for British Art